Aromas (Spanish for "Perfumes") is an unincorporated community and census-designated place (CDP) in Monterey County and San Benito County, California, United States. The population was 2,708 at the 2020 census.

The CDP straddles the border of the two counties, with Monterey County to the west and San Benito County to the east. Its population was almost equally distributed between the two counties with 1,358 in Monterey County and 1,292 in San Benito County; this was down from a population of 2,797 during the 2000 census (1,427 in Monterey County and 1,370 in San Benito County). Aromas is one of four CDPs in California that are divided between two or more counties. The others are Kingvale (divided between Placer County and Nevada County), Kirkwood (divided between Alpine County and Amador County), and Tahoma (divided between Placer County and El Dorado County).

History
The settlement was originally known as "Sand Cut", named from the Southern Pacific Railroad tunnel constructed nearby in 1871. The settlement was renamed Aromas, after Rancho Las Aromitas y Agua Caliente, around 1895.

Geography
Aromas is located in northern Monterey County and northwestern San Benito County at  (36.886988, -121.641396). Is it bordered to the south by Prunedale. U.S. Route 101 runs along the southeastern edge of the community, leading north  to Gilroy and south  to Salinas.

Demographics

2010
The 2010 United States Census reported that Aromas had a population of 2,650. The racial makeup of Aromas was 1,987 (75.0%) White, 16 (0.6%) African American, 37 (1.4%) Native American, 49 (1.8%) Asian, 4 (0.2%) Pacific Islander, 401 (15.1%) from other races, and 156 (5.9%) from two or more races. Hispanic or Latino of any race were 924 persons (34.9%).

The Census reported that 2,650 people (100% of the population) lived in households, 0 (0%) lived in non-institutionalized group quarters, and 0 (0%) were institutionalized.

There were 884 households, out of which 328 (37.1%) had children under the age of 18 living in them, 558 (63.1%) were opposite-sex married couples living together, 93 (10.5%) had a female householder with no husband present, 45 (5.1%) had a male householder with no wife present.  There were 36 (4.1%) unmarried opposite-sex partnerships, and 11 (1.2%) same-sex married couples or partnerships. 143 households (16.2%) were made up of individuals, and 49 (5.5%) had someone living alone who was 65 years of age or older. The average household size was 3.00.  There were 696 families (78.7% of all households); the average family size was 3.36.

The population was spread out, with 619 people (23.4%) under the age of 18, 244 people (9.2%) aged 18 to 24, 552 people (20.8%) aged 25 to 44, 956 people (36.1%) aged 45 to 64, and 279 people (10.5%) who were 65 years of age or older.  The median age was 42.2 years. For every 100 females, there were 102.0 males.  For every 100 females age 18 and over, there were 100.3 males.

The homeowner vacancy rate was 1.2%; the rental vacancy rate was 2.3%.  2,022 people (76.3% of the population) lived in owner-occupied housing units and 628 people (23.7%) lived in rental housing units.

2000
As of the census of 2000, there were 2,797 people, 889 households, and 731 families residing in the CDP. The racial makeup of the CDP was 79.23% White, 0.18% Black or African American, 1.32% Native American, 2.61% Asian, 0.07% Pacific Islander, 11.01% from other races, and 5.58% from two or more races.  22.92% of the population were Hispanic or Latino of any race.

There were 889 households, out of which 45.0% had children under the age of 18 living with them, 68.6% were married couples living together, 7.9% had a female householder with no husband present, and 17.7% were non-families. 11.8% of all households were made up of individuals, and 4.4% had someone living alone who was 65 years of age or older.  The average household size was 3.15 and the average family size was 3.42.

In the CDP, the population was spread out, with 30.3% under the age of 18, 6.5% from 18 to 24, 29.1% from 25 to 44, 26.5% from 45 to 64, and 7.7% who were 65 years of age or older.  The median age was 37 years. For every 100 females, there were 100.6 males.  For every 100 females age 18 and over, there were 98.2 males.

The median income for a household in the CDP was $69,145, and the median income for a family was $70,000. Males had a median income of $51,771 versus $41,875 for females. The per capita income for the CDP was $25,220.  About 5.7% of families and 6.2% of the population were below the poverty line, including 7.2% of those under age 18 and 10.2% of those age 65 or over.

Schools
The Aromas-San Juan School District has three schools – Aromas Elementary School, San Juan School and Anzar High School. Aromas has one K-8 school, Aromas Elementary School with less than 400 students, (in 2000). Heather Howell is the current principal of Aromas School.  Anzar High School, which opened in 1994, was named after early area pioneers.

Economy
Aromas is home to a Graniterock quarry. 

Since 1986, Fireclay Tile has been manufacturing architectural tile in Aromas.

Notes

References 
 U.S. Census Bureau. American Community Survey, 2011 American Community Survey 5-Year Estimates. U.S. Census website. Retrieved 2013-10-21.

External links 
Aromas at Explore Monterey County
 Aromas-San Juan Unified School District
 Short radio episode of Ygnacio Villegas's writing about "Las Aromas rancho" from California Legacy Project.

Census-designated places in San Benito County, California
Census-designated places in Monterey County, California
Census-designated places in California